Australia's Next Top Model is an Australian reality television series which premiered on 11 January 2005 and concluded on 22 November 2016, and was based on Tyra Banks' America's Next Top Model. It was broadcast on the Australian subscription television channel, Fox8.

Premise
The series featured a group of young female contestants who attended preliminary auditions across Australia with finalists selected to star in the series proper, where they ended up living together in a house for several weeks whilst taking part in lectures, challenges, photo shoots and meetings with members of the modelling industry. Normally, one contestant was eliminated each week until the last contestant remaining was declared "Australia's Next Top Model" and received a modelling contract and other associated prizes, usually a feature spread in an Australian fashion magazine, a cash prize, a new car and meetings with modelling agencies with the intention of securing future work.

Show format
Each episode of Top Model covered the events of roughly a week of real time (however, while overseas, an episode might cover a shorter period), and featured a fashion challenge, a photo shoot and/or commercial, a critique of each contestant and her performance by the judging panel, and the elimination of one or more contestants.

Judges

In the eighth season Jennifer Hawkins became the host of the series. Fashion designer Alex Perry is also currently a judge. Previous judges have included model Erika Heynatz, former Harper's Bazaar managing editor Marguerite Kramer, fashion stylist Ken Thompson, fashion producer Victoria Fisher, fashion photographer Georges Antoni, model-turned-designer Jodhi Meares, model-actress Sarah Murdoch, TV personality Charlotte Dawson and fashion photographer Jez Smith. In season 10, Megan Gale joined the panel. Usually there is an additional guest judge every week. There was a position of model mentor who was not a permanent judge but appeared in almost every episode of the season. In season 9 Didier Cohen and Cheyenne Tozzi served as mentors.

Requirements
In the first two series, contestants had to be at least 18 years old. However, the show lowered the age limit after realizing that most international models started their career earlier. Starting from season 3, contestants must be aged between 16 and 23 at the time of filming. Those auditioning had to be at least 172 cm (5 ft 8 in) tall. In the past, some contestants had weighed less than 60 kg, but there was no restriction on weight.

Differences between ANTM and AusNTM
Australia's Next Top Model shared the format of its American counterpart, but there were a few differences. On America's Next Top Model the final two models compete in a runway fashion show and the winner is chosen in the judging room. Starting from season 3, the final two contestants competed in front of a live studio audience in Sydney before the winner was revealed live-to-air. The judges, sponsors, and fashion professionals voted for the winner, along with the TV viewing public, whose votes contributed 15 per cent to the overall tally. Beginning with season 6, the format was changed. The final three (not two) were interviewed, shown their best bits from the competition, and participated in a runway show. The viewer votes decided the winner of the competition. From season 9 and onward, the show returned to pre-recorded finals.

Cycles

Controversy
Following a breach of contract with Heynatz's appearance on the Channel Seven series It Takes Two, she was replaced as host by Jodhi Meares,  who was consistently scrutinized for her lack of involvement in the show. During the season 3 live finale, she made a number of embarrassing blunders that drew commentary from critics on her ability to host. Things worsened when she pulled out of her hosting duties hours before the season 4 live finale. The swarm of negative comments from the press and fans of the show led to Meares' withdrawal from the programme.

In season 4, Demelza Reveley's win provoked negative feedback from critics and the public due to her bullying of Alamela Rowan during the fourth episode. During the finale, Vogue Australia's editor-in-chief, Kirstie Clements, and judge Charlotte Dawson voted in favor of fellow contestant Alexandra Girdwood because of Reveley's behaviour. The judges' scores were tied, so the decision came down to the public, who voted for Reveley.

After season 5, runner-up Cassi Van Den Dungen made a series of highly controversial comments. She was offered modeling contracts by Priscilla's Model Management in Australia and Elite Model Management in New York City. Cassi turned down both offers and quit modeling in order to remain in Sunbury with her boyfriend, Brad Saul, causing a backlash from the public, as well as from judges Alex Perry and Charlotte Dawson, who had vouched for Cassi on the show and urged her to pursue modeling. Cassi later stated in the press that she rejected the Elite contract because she didn't want to be pressured to drop from a size six to a four.

In the season 6 live final, the TV viewers voted to decide the winner. Initially, Sarah Murdoch announced Kelsey Martinovich as the winner of Australia's Next Top Model. Moments after Martinovich had made her victory speech, Murdoch stopped the celebrations and announced that Amanda Ware was the winner of season 6. An embarrassed Murdoch apologised repeatedly to Martinovich and the audience, stating that the final result was fed to her wrong. As compensation for the error, Foxtel awarded Martinovich a A$25,000 cash prize and an all-expenses paid trip to New York. Harper's Bazaar decided to release both Ware and Martinovich's covers for the November issue. In the days following the bungled announcement, top industry commentators expressed skepticism about whether the episode was a publicity stunt, with the editor of Harper's Bazaar Edwina McCann accusing Foxtel of manipulating the result. "The network did want Amanda to win ... They kept the voting lines open for a long time I think in the hope that she would get over the line. I'm told that it came down to three votes," she told the Nine Network.

In episode 6 of season 8, Taylah Roberts choked Ashley Pogmore after a painting challenge. Roberts was confronted by host Jennifer Hawkins at panel and she was ultimately disqualified from the competition. Before the footage was aired on television, the incident had been covered by several media outlets. It was also noted that while the disqualification might have been the proper course of action, it was still incorrect to showcase the occurrence as a selling point to draw in more viewers for the show.

See also

 List of Australian television series
 Top Model series

References

External links
 Official Australia's Next Top Model website
  All Australia's Next Top Model Gallery
 

Fox8 original programming
2000s Australian reality television series
2005 Australian television series debuts
2016 Australian television series endings
Television series by CBS Studios
English-language television shows
Television series by ITV Studios
Television shows set in New South Wales
Australian television series based on American television series
2010s Australian reality television series